Oskar Skarsaune (born 2 July 1946, in Trondheim) is professor of church history at MF Norwegian School of Theology in Oslo.

Skarsaune's major work on Justin Martyr, The Proof from Prophecy. A Study in Justin Martyr's Proof-Text Tradition: Text-Type, Provenance, Theological Profile is frequently cited.<ref>Paul and the Second Century 2011 p111  Michael F. Bird, Joseph R. Dodson "Oskar Skarsaune has Justin as the key focus of his analysis that probes the use of Justin's citational techniques."</ref> His study calls for a revision in views of accounts of Justin's conversion.The New Testament and early Christian literature in Greco-Roman ... 2006 p419  David Edward Aune, John Fotopoulos "As Oskar Skarsaune has demonstrated, Isa 2:3f “is the testimony on the apostolic mission in Justin.”57 In my opinion this statement can be expanded to include a majority of patristic writers from the second through the fifth centuries."Carl Sommer We look for a kingdom: the everyday lives of the early Christians 2007 p114 -"... as Oskar Skarsaune has shown, the scholars who see a contradiction between Justin's two conversion accounts have fundamentally misunderstood Justin's quest .22 Justin did not examine philosophies simply for the intellectual ..."

Skarsaune is also editor of and contributor to The History of Jewish Believers in Jesus from Antiquity to the Present'', which includes his study of the Ebionites – whom Skarsaune argued made a central claim of the parentage of Joseph, and against the virgin birth of Jesus. Skarsaune has close ties to the Messianic Jewish community in Israel and invited their contribution to the project.

References

20th-century Norwegian historians
1946 births
Writers from Trondheim
Living people
Academic staff of the MF Norwegian School of Theology, Religion and Society
Royal Norwegian Society of Sciences and Letters
21st-century Norwegian historians